Dry Martina is a 2018 Argentine-Chilean drama film directed and written by Che Sandoval. It tells the story of a former child star having lost their fame and longs for the kind of romantic encounters she once indulged in.

Plot 
Martina Andrade is a popular Argentine singer. She is very sexually liberated but suddenly becomes frigid after a breakup. One evening, Francisca, a young woman from Chile, visits her and claims to be her half-sister. She also tells her that her lost cat has been found by her boyfriend Cesar. Martina rejects her, but falls in love with Cesar. They sleep together but he has to go back to Chile. Martina then takes a plane to join him.

Cast 
 Antonella Costa as Martina
 Patricio Contreras as Nacho
 Dindi Jane as Francisca (as Geraldine Neary)
 Pedro Campos as César
 Héctor Morales as young man
 Alvaro Espinoza as Juan
 Yonar Sanchez as Samuel
 Lucas Espinoza as young man at rest stop
 Joaquin Fernández as Daniel
 Martín Garabal as Roberto (as Martin Garcia Garabal)
 Rafael Gumucio as Tomás
 Josefa Claude as hot girl at soda shop
 Fernando Guzzoni as hot boy at soda shop
 Humberto Miranda as janitor
 Joaquin Mussio as doctor
 Sergio Nicloux as Leonardo

References

External links 
 
 
 

2018 films
2018 drama films
Argentine drama films
Chilean drama films
Spanish-language Netflix original films
2010s Spanish-language films
2010s Argentine films
2010s Chilean films